Geesteren is a village in the eastern Netherlands, located in the municipality of Berkelland, Gelderland. It was hit by a small tornado 1988, which lifted the party tent to celebrate the 1000th anniversary of Geesteren and moved it two meters.

Geesteren was a separate municipality until 1818, when it was merged with nearby Borculo.

Buildings 
Geesteren is well known for its church, which is one of the three churches in Europe with a stepped gable, as a result of this, the tower is topped by two weather cocks instead of just one.

The wind powered grist mill De Ster (The Star) was built in 1859.

Gallery

References

Populated places in Gelderland
Former municipalities of Gelderland
Berkelland